Eldorado Township is one of twenty townships in Benton County, Iowa, USA.  As of the 2000 census, its population was 1,240.

Geography
According to the United States Census Bureau, Eldorado Township covers an area of 35.6 square miles (92.21 square kilometers).

Cities, towns, villages
 Newhall

Adjacent townships
 Eden Township (north)
 Canton Township (northeast)
 Fremont Township (east)
 Florence Township (southeast)
 St. Clair Township (south)
 Leroy Township (southwest)
 Union Township (west)
 Big Grove Township (northwest)

Cemeteries
The township contains these three cemeteries: Prairie Lutheran, Saint Johns Lutheran and Salem.

Major highways
  U.S. Route 30
  U.S. Route 218

School districts
 Benton Community School District

Political districts
 Iowa's 3rd congressional district
 State House District 39
 State Senate District 20

References
 United States Census Bureau 2007 TIGER/Line Shapefiles
 United States Board on Geographic Names (GNIS)
 United States National Atlas

External links
 US-Counties.com
 City-Data.com

Townships in Benton County, Iowa
Cedar Rapids, Iowa metropolitan area
Townships in Iowa